CCTR may refer to:

 Corpus Christi Terminal Railroad
 Camino Colombia Toll Road